C-MAC usually refers to  C-Multiplexed Analogue Components, variant of a satellite television transmission standard

C-MAC may also refer to:

See also  
 CMAC (disambiguation)